Formation signs at the division level were first introduced in the British Army in the First World War. They were intended (initially) as a security measure to avoid displaying the division's designation in the clear. They were used on vehicles, sign posts and notice boards and were increasingly, but not universally, worn on uniform as the War progressed. Discontinued by the regular army after 1918, only a few Territorial divisions continued to wear them before 1939. Reintroduced officially in late 1940 in the Second World War, divisional formation signs were much more prevalent on uniforms and were taken up by many other formations, independent brigades, corps, armies, overseas and home commands, military districts and lines of communication areas. The sign could be based on many things, geometry (simple or more complex), heraldry, regional or historical associations, a pun, the role of the division or a combination.

First World War
Until 1916, unit names were written on vehicles, notice boards and camp flags, when an order to end this insecure practice was given to adopt a 'device, mark or sign' particular to that division. Initially only a few divisions wore the division sign as a badge on clothing, including some which had been wearing one before the order. This practice became more widespread, especially in 1918 but not universal. The 43rd, 44th and 45th Divisions (all first line territorial) were sent to India to relieve the regular army there and did not adopt division insignia, as did numbers of second line territorial and home service divisions.

Battle Patches were distinct signs used at the battalion level as a means of identification on the battlefield, although some continued the scheme to include company and even platoon signs. Consisting of relatively simple shapes and colours they were introduced by Kitchener's Army troops in 1915 and could follow a divisional or brigade scheme or be based on the regimental colours or insignia. They were worn on the sleeves, the back of the tunic or painted on the helmet. (Examples: 23rd Division and 50th (Northumbrian) Division.)

Infantry

Cavalry

Empire

Commonwealth
Canadian divisions used simple colour oblongs as division signs. Each infantry battalion was shown by a colour and shape combination worn above the division sign, green, red or blue for the 1st, 2nd and 3rd brigades in each division and a circle, triangle, half circle or square for each battalion in the brigade. Other marks were used for brigade and division headquarters, machine gun and mortar units. The 5th Canadian division was broken up for reinforcements before being fully formed and would have had a burgundy–purple colour patch.

Australian formation signs used a system whereby the shape of the sign identified the division and the colour-shape combination within the particular unit, with 15 combinations for the infantry alone in each division. The Australian division signs shown below are those for the division headquarters. Infantry intended for a 6th Australian Division was used instead for reinforcements, those infantry battalions used an upright oval.

Second World War

The use of divisional signs on uniform was discontinued by the regular army after the First World War, although when reformed in 1920, some territorial divisions continued to wear the signs they had adopted previously. By the start of the Second World War, the British Army prohibited all identifying marks on its Battle Dress uniforms save for drab (black or white on khaki) regimental or corps (branch) slip-on titles, and even these were not to be worn in the field. In May 1940 an order (Army Council Instruction (ACI) 419) was issued banning division signs worn on uniforms, even though some were in use on vehicles in France. Some infantry battalions in France had even started wearing battle patches in a similar manner to their First World War antecedents.

In September 1940 ACI 419 was replaced with ACI 1118, and division signs were permitted to be worn on uniform below the shoulder title. Below this was worn an 'arm of service' stripe ( by ) showing the relevant corps colour (for example Artillery, red and blue, Service Corps, yellow and blue, RAMC dark cherry, and so on, see right). Battalion specific or general regimental patches, in addition to the shoulder title, could also be worn below the arm of service stripe, but the cost of these had to be borne from regimental funds, not the War Office.

Until D-Day these signs were only to be displayed or worn in Britain, if a division went overseas all formation markings had to be removed from vehicles (tactical signs excepted) and uniforms. This order was obeyed to varying degrees in various theatres of war. However, 21st Army Group formations wore their signs when they went to France.

The signs shown below were used as vehicle signs and worn on uniform (except where noted). The short-lived 7th Infantry Division did not have a formation sign and that for the 66th Division was designed but never used. Those for the 12th and 23rd divisions were worn by a small number of troops left behind in Britain. In the British Army, ACI 1118 specified that the design for the formation sign should be approved by the general officer commanding the formation and reported to the War Office. A further order of December 1941 (ACI 2587) specified the material of the uniform patch as printed cotton (ordnance issue), this replaced the embroidered felt (or fulled wool) or metal badges used previously. In other theatres the uniform patch could be made from a variety of materials including printed or woven cotton, woven silk, leather or metal embroidered felt (or fulled wool).

Infantry

Armoured

Airborne

Empire

Commonwealth
Commonwealth and Dominion forces were exempt from the order banning formation marks on uniform issued in May 1940.  The Canadians reused the formation signs of the First World War without the brigade and battalion distinguishing marks. The home service division's signs (6th, 7th and 8th) were made using combinations of the service division's colours. The vehicles of the divisions added a gold coloured maple leaf centrally to the coloured oblong. The Division intended to invade Japan, the 6th Canadian Division (CAPF), used all the division colours and the black of the armoured brigades, volunteers for this division sewed a miniature of this sign on top of whichever formation sign they were wearing at the time.

South African division signs used the national colours.

The Australian militia used the inherited colour patches used in the First World War, the units of the Second Australian Imperial Force (A.I.F.) added a grey border to the patch for those troops reusing the same colours and introduced new division shapes for the armoured divisions. The grey border was allowed to be worn by individuals in a militia unit who had volunteered for an A.I.F unit, or in the case of a soldier who had served overseas, they wore a miniature grey bordered patch of their A.I.F. unit above their militia patch. Units or individuals from the militia, retaining their non-overseas service status, joining A.I.F. units or formations for which the patch was manufactured with a grey border, removed or trimmed the border back. The system, initially for identifying militia and A.I.F units, to one identifying individuals, caused some confusion. All Australian divisions had distinct vehicle markings in addition to the signs worn on the uniform shown below. The uniform signs shown below were worn by division headquarters personnel.

The New Zealand Division used a system of colour patches to distinguish its various units, the sign below is the vehicle sign.

Anti-Aircraft
All Anti-Aircraft divisions were disbanded on 1 October 1942, the component units then displayed the Anti-Aircraft Command sign.

County
County divisions were infantry only formations charged with anti-invasion duties, formed in late 1940 to early 1941 and all disbanded before the end of 1941. All but the Devon and Cornwall Division are marked (albeit with question marks) on a German map of May 1944, detailing the German appreciation of the allied build up for the invasion.

Deception

The formation signs intended to deceive the Axis forces were either worn by small units in the appropriate theatre (40th and 57th divisions in the Mediterranean) or described to the German intelligence services by turned agents.

Post War

Infantry

Armoured

Modern
The Modern era is taken to be the end of the Cold War and the implementation of Options for Change.

References

Bibliography
 
 
 
 
 
 
 
 
 
 
 
 
 Cigarette card series, Army, Corps and Divisional Signs 1914–1918, John Player and sons, 1920s.

British Army divisional insignia
Divisions of the United Kingdom in World War I
Infantry divisions of the British Army in World War II
British armoured divisions
British Indian Army divisions
Military units and formations of the British Empire in World War II
British military uniforms
British Army unit insignia